Thailand Cultural Centre MRT station (code BL19) is a Bangkok MRT station on the Blue Line. It is located under Ratchadaphisek Road, near Thailand Cultural Centre and Stock Exchange of Thailand and MRT depot. During construction, the station had been named Thian Ruam Mit.

Station details 
The station uses symbol as color blue. It is underground station, widths 27 meters, lengths 358 meters, depths 20 meters, and uses island platform.

There are MetroMall in the station, but not opened yet.

Future 
The under-construction MRT Orange line will interchange with MRT Blue Line at Thailand Cultural Centre station. Orange line will begin at Thailand Cultural Centre station and run eastward to Suwinthawong. In 2020, cabinet approved the extension of Orange line from Thailand Cultural Centre westward to Bang Khun Non.

Major accident record 
On 17 January 2005, just after 09:15, an empty train returning to the depot collided with a peak-hour train filled with passengers at the Thailand Cultural Centre station. 140 people were hurt, most of whom sustained only minor injuries, and the entire Metro network was shut down for two weeks.

After initial investigations, it was found that the empty train had run into problems shortly before the accident, grinding to a halt on a curve leading to the depot. The driver applied its brake and was waiting to be towed to the maintenance center close to Thailand Cultural Centre station.

A rescue train was attempting to connect to the stalled train when the driver was told to release the brake while coupling had not yet been successful. It was then that the empty train began to roll backwards at a speed of ten meters per second, before smashing into the other train, which was carrying passengers. Therefore, it was believed that the incident was caused by negligence due to insufficient training of operation staff. This accident also resulted in two damaged trains with heavily damaged areas limited to the two leading cars. The colliding speed was suspected to be about 60 km/h due to the appearance of damaged areas. However, one train, which was rebuilt from the repair of the minor-damaged cars, was already fitted for operation at the end of 2006 and the remaining one was still under heavy repair until mid of 2007; it was put into service in October, 2007. The cost resulting from the accident might be a much higher figure than BMCL quoted, and it was expected to be at least 400 million baht, which was totally insured by a local insurance company.

The Metro resumed full operation on 1 February 2005, and passenger numbers soon rose back to pre-crash levels, partly due to a temporary promotional fare scheme which allowed passengers to travel any distance on the MRT for only ten baht (~0.33 USD).

References 

MRT (Bangkok) stations
Railway stations opened in 2004
2004 establishments in Thailand